The 2015 Meath Senior Football Championship is the 123rd edition of the Meath GAA's premier club Gaelic football tournament for senior clubs in County Meath, Ireland. Eighteen  teams compete, with the winner going on to represent Meath in the Leinster Senior Club Football Championship. The championship starts with a group stage and then progresses to a knock out stage.

Navan O'Mahonys were the defending champions after they defeated Donaghmore/Ashbourne in the previous years final, and they successfully defended their title, becoming the first team to manage that feat since Dunshaughlin's three-in-a-row between 2000-02. The Navan side defeated Na Fianna 0-13 to 1-8 on Bank Holiday Monday 26 October 2015 in Pairc Tailteann. This was the first time the final was held on a Monday.
Former Meath player Gary O'Brien raised the Keegan Cup for the 20th time for O'Mahonys while goalkeeper Marcus Brennan claimed the 'Man of the Match' award.

This was Ballinlough's return to the senior grade 8 years since relegation in 2007 after claiming the 2014 Meath Intermediate Football Championship title.
 
The draw for the group stages of the championship were made on 9 February 2015 with the games commencing on the weekend of 10 April 2015.

Walterstown were relegated to the Intermediate grade after 51 years in the top flight. The 'Blacks' are the only Meath side to reach an All-Ireland Club SFC Final (1980–81 and 1983–84). The only club to have been in the top flight for longer are Skryne, who have played senior football since 1938 (78 years in 2015).

Team Changes
The following teams have changed division since the 2014 championship season.

To S.F.C.
Promoted from I.F.C.
 Ballinlough  -  (Intermediate Champions)

From S.F.C.
Relegated to I.F.C.
 Oldcastle

Participating Teams
The teams taking part in the 2015 Meath Senior Football Championship are:

Group stage

There are 3 groups called Group A,B and C. The 2 top finishers in each group and the third-place finisher in Group A will qualify for the Quarter Finals. The third placed teams in Group B and C will qualify for a Preliminary Quarter Final, with the winner earning a place in last eight. The bottom finishers of each group will qualify for the Relegation Play Off. The draw for the group stages of the championship were made on 9 February 2015 with the games commencing on the weekend of 10 April 2015.

Group A

Round 1
 St. Peter's Dunboyne 1-16, 1-4 Duleek/Bellewstown, Ashbourne, 10/4/2015,
 Wolfe Tones 2-13, 0-9 Moynalvey, Pairc Tailteann, 11/4/2015,
 Summerhill 3-12, 0-10 Rathkenny, Pairc Tailteann, 12/4/2015,

Round 2
 St. Peter's Dunboyne 1-10, 1-9 Wolfe Tones, Pairc Tailteann, 19/4/2015,
 Moynalvey 3-10, 0-13 Summerhill, Trim, 25/4/2015,
 Duleek/Bellewstown 0-10, 0-7 Rathkenny, Simonstown, 26/4/2015,

Round 3
 Moynalvey 2-18, 1-10 Duleek/Bellewstown, Walterstown, 21/5/2015,
 St. Peter's Dunboyne 0-14, 1-10 Rathkenny, Trim, 22/5/2015,
 Summerhill 1-15, 0-10 Wolfe Tones, Dunsany, 23/5/2015,

Round 4
 St. Peter's Dunboyne 2-20, 0-10 Moynalvey, Summerhill, 7/8/2015,
 Duleek/Bellewstown 1-13, 1-13 Summerhill, Ratoath, 9/8/2015,
 Wolfe Tones 2-8, 1-9 Rathkenny, Pairc Tailteann, 9/8/2015,

Round 5
 Wolfe Tones 0-15, 2-5 Duleek/Bellewstown, Skryne, 23/8/2015,
 Rathkenny 2-10, 1-4 Moynalvey, Walterstown, 23/8/2015,
 Summerhill 2-10, 0-7 St. Peter's Dunboyne, Dunsany, 23/8/2015,

Group B

Round 1
 Navan O'Mahonys 2-17, 2-5 Seneschalstown, Pairc Tailteann, 10/4/2015,
 Donaghmore/Ashbourne 2-11, 2-6 Ballinlough, Walterstown, 11/4/2015,
 Skryne 1-14, 3-3 St. Patrick's, Duleek, 11/4/2015,

Round 2
 Navan O'Mahonys 1-12, 1-8 Donaghmore/Ashbourne, Walterstown, 19/4/2015,
 Ballinlough 2-8, 1-10 St. Patrick's, Simonstown, 24/4/2015,
 Skryne 0-14, 1-9 Seneschalstown, Ratoath, 26/4/2015,

Round 3
 St. Patrick's 1-12, 0-15 Navan O'Mahonys, Duleek, 22/5/2015,
 Skryne 0-14, 2-4 Ballinlough, Kells, 24/5/2015,
 Donaghmore/Ashbourne 1-11, 0-11 Seneschalstown, Stamullen, 24/5/2015,

Round 4
 Ballinlough 0-12, 1-8 Navan O'Mahonys, Athboy, 7/8/2015,
 Seneschalstown 1-11, 1-8 St. Patrick's, Duleek, 8/8/2015,
 Donaghmore/Ashbourne 0-20, 1-7 Skryne, Stamullen, 9/8/2015,

Round 5
 Navan O'Mahonys 2-10, 0-10 Skryne, Simonstown, 23/8/2015,
 Donaghmore/Ashbourne 2-16, 3-4 St. Patrick's, Duleek, 23/8/2015,
 Seneschalstown 1-10, 0-9 Ballinlough, Pairc Tailteann, 23/8/2015,

Group C

Round 1
 Walterstown 2-9, 3-6 Simonstown Gaels, Trim, 12/4/2015,
 Dunshaughlin 0-15, 1-7 Gaeil Colmcille, Seneschalstown, 12/4/2015,
 Na Fianna 1-10, 0-12 Blackhall Gaels, Summerhill, 18/4/2015,
 
Round 2
 Gaeil Colmcille 2-12, 1-9 Simonstown Gaels, Brews Hill, 24/4/2015,
 Na Fianna 3-10, 1-10 Dunshaughlin, Trim, 24/4/2015,
 Blackhall Gaels 1-11, 2-4 Walterstown, Skryne, 24/4/2015,

Round 3
 Dunshaughlin 0-14, 1-5 Walterstown, Trim, 24/5/2015,
 Gaeil Colmcille 1-16, 1-8 Na Fianna, Summerhill, 24/5/2015,
 Simonstown Gaels 3-13, 1-10 Blackhall Gaels, Skryne, 29/5/2015,

Round 4
 Gaeil Colmcille 1-15, 1-11 Blackhall Gaels, Walterstown, 6/8/2015,
 Na Fianna 2-10, 0-9 Walterstown, Pairc Tailteann, 8/8/2015,
 Simonstown Gaels 1-15, 0-15 Dunshaughlin, Pairc Tailteann, 11/8/2015,

Round 5
 Gaeil Colmcille 0-13, 0-9 Walterstown, Castletown, 22/8/2015,
 Dunshaughlin 3-12, 0-12 Blackhall Gaels, Moynalvey, 22/8/2015,
 Na Fianna 1-12, 0-14 Simonstown Gaels, Pairc Tailteann, 22/8/2015,

Knock-out Stages

Relegation Play Off
The three bottom finishers from each group qualify for the relegation play off and play each other in a round robin basis.
The team with the worst record after two matches will be relegated to the 2016 Intermediate Championship.

 Game 1: Rathkenny 1-15, 2-7 St. Patrick's, Brews Hill, 4/9/2015,
 Game 2: St. Patrick's 0-13, 0-9 Walterstown, Seneschalstown, 12/9/2015,
 Game 3: Walterstown 0-9, 1-13 Rathkenny, Simonstown, 23/9/2015,

Finals
The winners and runners up of each group qualify for the quarter finals along with the third-placed finisher of Group A.

Preliminary Quarter-Final:
 Dunshaughlin 3-14, 3-12 Skryne, Simonstown, 4/9/2015,

Quarter-Finals:
 Na Fianna 1-15, 0-11 Donaghmore/Ashbourne, Pairc Tailteann, 5/9/2015,
 Gaeil Colmcille 2-7, 0-12 Wolfe Tones, Pairc Tailteann, 6/9/2015,
 Navan O'Mahonys 1-18, 0-9 Summerhill, Pairc Tailteann, 6/9/2015,
 St. Peter's Dunboyne 1-14, 0-13 Dunshaughlin, Pairc Tailteann, 12/9/2015,

Semi-Finals:
 Na Fianna 1-19, 0-12 Gaeil Colmcille, Pairc Tailteann, 3/10/2015,
 Navan O'Mahonys 0-22, 2-13 St. Peter's Dunboyne, Pairc Tailteann, 4/10/2015,

Final:
 Navan O'Mahonys 0-13, 1-8 Na Fianna, Pairc Tailteann, 26/10/2015,

The final between Navan O'Mahonys and Na Fianna was originally fixed for Sunday 18 October but due to a clash with Ireland -vs- Argentina in the quarter-finals of the 2015 Rugby World Cup, it was switched to Bank Holiday Monday 26 October to encourage a larger crowd to attend the final.

Leinster Senior Club Football Championship

Quarter Final:
 Killoe Young Emmets 0-11, 1-6 Navan O'Mahonys, Pearse Park, 8/11/2015,

References

External links

Meath Senior Football Championship
Meath Senior Football Championship